Yogi the Easter Bear is an American animated television special starring Yogi Bear, produced by Hanna-Barbera and animated by Filipino animation studio Fil-Cartoons. It was broadcast in syndication on April 3, 1994. This is one of Don Messick's last voice-over roles; he suffered a debilitating stroke in 1996 and died in 1997. It would also be the last official Yogi Bear media for 16 years until the release of the live-action Yogi Bear film.

Plot
Ranger Smith's boss, the Supreme Commissioner, is attending Jellystone Park's Easter Jamboree with his grandchildren. Concerned about making sure the event goes off perfectly, Smith picks out an Easter Bunny suit and orders a truckload of candy for the celebration, ordering his nearsighted guard, Mortimer, to watch over the candy truck and keep Yogi Bear away from eating any of the candy. Yogi steals the Easter Bunny outfit, dupes Mortimer into thinking he is the real Easter Bunny, and eats all the candy in the truck.

Smith is furious and threatens to deport Yogi to the Siberian Circus (just as he had threatened in the previous film), but Boo Boo offers to find the real Easter Bunny and bring him to the jamboree. Smith states that he stopped believing in the Easter Bunny after he didn't get a double-decker raspberry-filled dark chocolate egg from him, but happily appreciates Boo Boo's offer, but tells Yogi to pack his bags. Ranger Smith fears that he too will end up being transferred to Siberia by the commissioner if the jamboree fails. Yogi and Boo Boo seek out the Grand Grizzly in the mountains to see if he knows anything about the Easter Bunny's whereabouts. The cantankerous Grand Grizzly instructs Yogi and Boo Boo to seek the big ears in the sky (a hilltop resembling rabbit ears). They reach the mountain, using the park's hot air balloon, only to find that the Easter Bunny has been kidnapped.

Behind the kidnapping is a short and deranged businessman named Paulie, whose goal is to replace all of the world's Easter eggs so people will have to buy these plastic ones, and his massive but dim-witted sidekick named Ernest. Yogi and Boo Boo follow a trail of jelly beans to the factory, where the Easter Bunny is being held captive above a vat of molten plastic. Posing as health inspectors, Yogi and Boo Boo successfully free the Easter Bunny, only to find that Mildred the Magical Easter Chicken is the one responsible for laying the Easter eggs. Yogi and Boo Boo go to the Easter Henhouse to meet her but are accosted by her guard dog, who refuses entry to anyone except Ernest, whom the dog mistakes for the real Easter Bunny. Yogi and Boo Boo, after using a giant slingshot to crash through the henhouse's roof, escape with the chicken before Paulie and Ernest can get to her and head for Jellystone Park. A madcap chase after the chicken begins, with the Easter Bunny falling off a cliff and getting seriously injured three times.

Meanwhile, back at Jellystone Park, Smith is trying in vain to impress the children and the Commissioner at the Easter Jamboree. The stunts he tries either are ridiculously lame or fail spectacularly, and the Commissioner's grandchildren show no response except a few sarcastic claps and a stern look. The boss is on the verge of firing Ranger Smith when the Easter Bunny, Mildred, Yogi, and Boo Boo crash-land on stage, saving the day. The Commissioner changes his mind and instead promotes Ranger Smith, who decides to let Yogi stay at Jellystone; to thank Ranger Smith for believing, the miraculously healed Easter Bunny gives him what he asked for all these years: a double-decker raspberry-filled dark chocolate egg.

Cast
 Greg Burson - Yogi Bear
 Don Messick - Boo Boo Bear and Ranger Smith
 Charlie Adler - Paulie
 Gregg Berger - Guard Dog and the Narrator
 Marsha Clark - Female Ranger
 Jeff Doucette - Ernest
 Ed Gilbert - Supreme Commissioner Clarence and Grand Grizzly
 Rob Paulsen - Easter Bunny, Male Ranger
 Jonathan Winters - Ranger Mortimer

Credits
 Executive Producers: Bill Hanna and Joe Barbera
 Music by: Steven Bramson
 Story by: Davis Doi, Jeff Holder, Scott Jeralds, Bob Onorato, Pat Ventura
 Produced by: Davis Doi
 Directed by: Robert Alvarez 
 Story Editor: Joe Barbera
 Production Design: Davis Doi, Scott Jeralds
 Teleplay by: Jeff Holder
 Unit Production Supervisor: Victoria McCollum
 Argentina · Storyboarding: Jaime Diaz Studios
 Animation Directors: Joanna Romersa, Allen Wilzbach, Robert Alvarez, Joan Drake, Frank Andrina, Rick Bowman
 Casting and Recording Director: Kris Zimmerman
 Supervising Recording Engineer: Edwin Collins
 Recording Engineer: Alvy Dorman
 Voices: Greg Burson, Don Messick, Charlie Adler, Gregg Berger, Marsha Clark, Jeff Doucette, Ed Gilbert, Rob Paulsen, Jonathan Winters
 Design Supervisor: Bob Onorato
 Designers: Mike Takamoto, Pete Alvarado, Eric Clark, Kirk Hanson, Butch Hartman, Scott Hill, Scott Jeralds, Lew Ott, Steve Swaja
 Design Assistants: Dana Jo Granger, Donna Zeller, Jesus Rodriguez
 Layout Keys Supervisor: Drew Gentle
 Layout: Bob Givens, Dick Ung, Drew Gentle, Martin Strudler, Lew Ott, Karenia Kaminski, Dean Thompson, John Perry, Hal Mason
 Background Supervisor: Al Gmuer
 Background Color Stylist: Ron Dias
 Background Design: Gary Lund, Richard H. Thomas
 Background: Ruben Chavez, Leonard Robledo, Patricia Palmer-Phillipson, Richard H. Thomas, Flamarion Ferreira, Mike Humphries, Alison Julian, F. Monte, Andy Phillipson, Phil Phillipson, Jeff Richards, Craig Robertson, Tom Woodington
 Director of Music Production: Bodie Chandler
 Ink & Paint Supervisor: Alison Leopold
 Color Key: Suzette Darling
 Xerography: Star Wirth
 Post Production Supervisor: Tom Gleason
 Camera: John Burton Jr., Larry Hogan, Ray Lee
 Camera by: Ted Bemiller & Son's Camera, Morgan's Maxi-Cam
 Supervising Editors: Tim Iverson, Lee Gunther
 Editors: Gil Iverson
 Post Production Coordinator: Jeannine Roussel
 Track Readers: Jim Hearn, Kay Douglas, Carol Iverson, Kerry Iverson
 Negative Consultant: William DeBoer, Jr.
 Assistant to the Producer: Mary Roscoe
 Animation Production Service by: Fil-Cartoons, Inc.
 Overseas Production Manager: Jerry Smith
 Overseas Layout Director: Margaret Parkes
 Overseas Animation Directors: Chris Cuddington, Aichu So
 Production Executive: Catherine Winder
 Program Executive: Jeff Holder
 This Picture Made Under the Jurisdiction of IATSE-IA Affiliated with A.F.L.-C.I.O.
 © 1994 Hanna-Barbera Cartoons, Inc. All Rights Reserved

Home media

VHS release
On February 15, 1995, Turner Home Entertainment released Yogi the Easter Bear on VHS in Region 1 in the United States and Canada, and on VHS in Region 4 on December 22, 1995 by Roadshow Entertainment in Australia. Two years later, on February 4, 1997, Turner re-released the special as part of their Cartoon Network Video line. On March 21, 2000, it was released on VHS for the last time, distributed by Warner Home Video and Warner Bros. Family Entertainment for their Century 2000 promotion.

DVD release
Warner Home Video released Yogi the Easter Bear on DVD in Region 1 on February 8, 2005.  The special was re-released together with the 2010 film Yogi Bear in a limited DVD double pack on March 22, 2011.

References

External links
 

Yogi Bear films
Yogi Bear television specials
1994 films
1994 animated films
1994 television specials
Easter television specials
Animated television specials
Hanna-Barbera television specials
Films scored by Steven Bramson
Hanna-Barbera animated films
Easter Bunny in television
1990s American films